Uppinakudru, located 6 km north of Kundapura Udupi District (Karnataka, India), is a small island village, once famous for trading of salt (uppu) and seafood (picking of sea shells in backwaters). UppinaKudru (UK) is also having short name of UK. So this is called as UK of Kundapura. This is also known as 'The King of Kudrus'.

Etymology
Uppina Kudru name comes from two words in Kannada. It means an island of salt or place where salt is produced and exported.

History
It was isolated from main land of Kundapura and main means of transport was by boats only. During Tippu Sultan's regime, Uppinakudru was a major armament storage point. It is also a through destination from Arabian Sea towards Basrur which was a major trade centre up to 19th Century. Coconut trees were to be found around the island which literally hide the island from pirates, which was useful up to 20th century as this village was near an important trade sea route. Vessels sailing to Basrur, (then an important business centre, now a village) must pass Uppinakudru village.

Education
The village has three Kinder Gartens of which one requires new building (presently running in Lord Vasudeva temple). The higher primary school, which was built in 1917, has churned out nearly 5000 students. It has mid-day meal scheme running efficiently. In the year 1992 a new building was constructed. Sri U. Nagappa Aithal and Yajnanarayana Aithal are motivating personalities of new building for the higher elementary school.

High school
The Government high school in this village was established on 16-01-1993. It had a strength of 125 students during 2005. 569 students have passed as of 2005. Consistently more than 90% of students are passing out every year.

Economy
People of this village largely depend on agriculture. They grow paddy, ground nut and various types of dhal (pulses/lentils). There is a milk collecting centre which provides livelihood for many people. Formerly sugarcane was grown. This is not grown anymore as there is no reliable market nearby. Self-help groups which have come into existence recently have helped many people to stand on their own legs through co-operative movement.

Yakshagana puppetry
Yakshagana string puppet show is the major art of this village (puppet dance with music in Yakshagana style). The wooden puppets are about 18 inches high. Their costumes are similar to those worn by the characters from Yakshagana Bayalata, with the same elaborate make-up, high and colorful headgear and heavy jewellery. The person who infuses life into the puppet and makes it come alive, by dexterous manipulation, is the puppet master, known as the 'Suthradhara'.

The contents of the Yakshagana puppetry, as in every other ancient performing art, are drawn from the Epics and Bhagavatha Purana. There may have been possibilities for embracing secular themes, but the older tradition still persists. Yakshagana puppetry has lived through the onslaught of social and economic ravages and now reposes safely in the hands of handful of devoted practitioners.

Sri Kogga Devanna Kamath also won National Award in 1980, State Award in 1986 and Tulsi Samman in 1995 for his contribution to Yakshagana puppet show.

Awards

National awards
This tiny village has been bestowed with four national awards.
In Education field, Sri Anantha Maiya and Sri U. Nagappa Aithal are the recipients of national award. 
Father-son duo of Sri Devanna Kamath & Sri Kogga Devanna Kamath are the other recipients of National award in fine arts. Their specialization is in Yakshagana string puppetry.

See also 

 Yakshagana
 Kundapura Taluk

External links 
 Goto uppinakudrufriends group
 Yakshagana string puppets

Islands of Karnataka
Villages in Udupi district
Geography of Udupi district
Populated places in India